The 139th Massachusetts General Court, consisting of the Massachusetts Senate and the Massachusetts House of Representatives, met in 1918 during the governorship of Samuel W. McCall. Henry Gordon Wells served as president of the Senate and Channing H. Cox served as speaker of the House.

Senators

Representatives

See also
 1918 Massachusetts gubernatorial election
 65th United States Congress
 List of Massachusetts General Courts

Images

References

Further reading

External links

 
 

Political history of Massachusetts
Massachusetts legislative sessions
massachusetts
1918 in Massachusetts